Alexander de Turre, C.R.L. (died 1624) was a Roman Catholic prelate who served as Bishop of Hierapetra et Sitia (1594–1624).

Biography
Alexander de Turre was born in 1555 and ordained a priest in the Canons Regular of the Lateran. On 31 January 1594, he was appointed during the papacy of Pope Clement VIII as Bishop of Hierapetra et Sitia. On 13 February 1594, he was consecrated bishop by Ludovico de Torres, Archbishop of Monreale, with Melchiorre Pelletta, Titular Bishop of Chrysopolis in Arabia, and Owen Lewis (bishop), Bishop of Cassano all'Jonio, serving as co-consecrators. He served as Bishop of Hierapetra et Sitia until his death in 1624.

While bishop, he was the principal consecrator of Bartol Kačić, Bishop of Makarska, and the principal co-consecrator of Leonardo Tritonio, Bishop of Poreč (1609).

References 

16th-century Roman Catholic bishops in the Republic of Venice
17th-century Roman Catholic bishops in the Republic of Venice
Bishops appointed by Pope Clement VIII
1624 deaths
1555 births